Eliahu Ilan Elezra (born November 24, 1960, in Jerusalem) is an Israeli professional poker player and businessman, now living in Las Vegas, Nevada. With five WSOP bracelets and a WPT win in the post Moneymaker era, he is one of the most successful players since the poker boom.

Since moving to America, Elezra has had more than 70 money finishes in the WSOP in Omaha, Texas Hold 'em and Draw events. In July 2004, Elezra won the WPT Mirage Poker Showdown, where he collected $1,024,574 for his efforts. Elezra has played in "The Big Game" in Vegas for many years. He appeared in the second and third season of the Poker Superstars Invitational Tournament. Elezra came known to the big public when he played in seasons 1–6 of the legendary GSN series High Stakes Poker and has appeared on several episodes of Poker After Dark. He also was a Full Tilt Pro.

Elezra won his first bracelet by winning the World Championship Seven Card Stud Hi-Low in the WSOP of 2007 after defeating Scotty Nguyen heads-up. Before the event, Elezra had made a side bet with Barry Greenstein laying 10:1 odds that he would win a World Series bracelet in 2007. He bet $25,000 and collected $250,000, resulting in more money than the first place prize in the event that he won.

As of 2022, his total live tournament winnings exceed $5,000,000. His cashes at the WSOP account for over $3,000,000 of those winnings.

Elezra released a biography about his life and career in poker in March 2017 entitled Poker Legend. The book was co-written by professional Israeli poker players Matan Krakow and Yoav Ronal. The book was translated into English by Robbie Strazynski and published by Two Plus Two Publishing under the title Pulling the Trigger in January 2019.

Elezra was inducted into the Poker Hall of Fame in 2021.

World Series of Poker bracelets

Personal life 
Eli Elezra served in one of the Israeli Defense Force's Golani Brigades. During his time in the army, he served time in an Israeli prison for disobeying military orders.

He was discharged after he sustained a leg injury in the 1982 Lebanon War.

Later, he moved to the USA where he first began to work in the fish industry in Alaska, before making his way to Las Vegas to become the owner of a successful film-developing business in 1988. It was thanks to this venture that he started to enter the poker scene.

Notes

External links
Eli Elezra Interview (video + transcript)

1960 births
Living people
21st-century American businesspeople
American poker players
Israeli businesspeople
Israeli emigrants to the United States
Israeli Jews
Israeli poker players
People from Jerusalem
World Poker Tour winners
World Series of Poker bracelet winners
Businesspeople from Las Vegas